Hatfield railway station serves the town of Hatfield in Hertfordshire, England. The station is managed by Great Northern.

History 

Hatfield was formerly the junction of a branch to St Albans. The Hatfield and St Albans Railway closed to passenger traffic in 1951 as part of postwar economies brought in by the British Transport Commission. The route of the line is now a public footpath, the Alban Way.

Station masters

Mr. Unwin ca. 1850 (acting)
Edmund Cooter 1856 - 1866 (formerly station master at Hornsey)
Mr. Bellamy ???? - 1878
Robert Vodden 1878 - 1906 
Thomas Christopher 1910 - 1915 (afterwards station master at Doncaster)
John Thomas Cross 1917 - 1923
Frederick B. Martin 1932 - 1939
Arthur W. Bellamy 1940 - 1949
T.J. Piggott 1951  - ???? (formerly station master at Sandy)
A.G. Dixon ca. 1960

Facilities

Hatfield has waiting rooms on all platforms, with extra shelters provided at various points along the platforms, as well as a canopy on Platform 1. There is a small café-shop style business, "Chuggs" on Platform 1, and three new retail units which opened in the new station building. There are three platform faces in total - platform 1 is a side platform facing the Up Slow line & used by London-bound trains (there is no platform on the Up Fast line), whilst platforms 2 & 3 face the Down Fast and Down Slow lines respectively; the latter is used by the majority of northbound trains.

The station has a "Fast-Ticket" machine, as well as a standard touchscreen machine on either side of the building. Hatfield also has many vending machines throughout the station and a photo booth inside the booking hall, which also contains male/female toilets and a separate disabled toilet. Ticket barriers are in operation.

Services
Services at Hatfield are operated by Thameslink and Great Northern using  and  EMUs.

The typical off-peak service in trains per hour is:
 2 tph to 

During the peak hours, the service to Letchworth Garden City is extended to Cambridge and the service between Moorgate and Welwyn Garden City is increased to 4 tph.

The station is also served by a small number of Thameslink operated services between Welwyn Garden City and  via the Thameslink Core.

Redevelopment

Hatfield Station was redeveloped in 2013—15 to include a new bus interchange and taxi rank, multi-storey car park, refurbished ticket office, three new retail units and step-free access to all platforms.

Work on the project, which was to cost £9 million, began in 2013 and was completed by the end of 2015.

The new multi-storey car park opened on 17 November 2014.

Accidents

Three fatal rail crashes have occurred near Hatfield:
 December 1870 accident, when a disintegrated wheel resulted in the deaths of six passengers and two bystanders.
Two accidents occurred on 26 January 1939. In the first, an empty fish train was involved in a rear-end collision with a passenger train. The second involved a passenger train which ran into the rear of another. Two people were killed and seven were injured.
 October 2000 accident, when a GNER InterCity 225 train de-railed, killing four people and injuring 70.

Gallery

References

External links 

Railway stations in Hertfordshire
DfT Category C2 stations
Former Great Northern Railway stations
Railway stations in Great Britain opened in 1850
Railway stations served by Govia Thameslink Railway